Indochine Au Zénith is the first live album by French new wave band, Indochine, and fourth album overall. It was released on October 20, 1986.

Track listing
 Ouverture (La Conquête De L'Ouest) - 0:33  
 A L'Assaut (Des Ombres Sur L'O) - 4:12 
 Canary Bay - 5:19 
 L'Opportuniste - 2:45 
 3e Sexe - 6:26 
 L'Aventurier - 5:00 
 A L'Est De Java - 5:22 
 Salômbo - 4:55 
 Miss Paramount - 2:59 
 3 Nuits Par Semaine - 5:42 
 Kao Bang - 5:21 
 Dizzidence Politik - 5:04 
 Tes Yeux Noirs - 6:05

External links
 Detailed album information at www.indo-chine.org

Indochine (band) albums
1986 live albums